Simonne Mathieu and Elizabeth Ryan successfully defended their title, defeating Dorothy Andrus and Sylvie Henrotin in the final, 6–3, 6–3 to win the ladies' doubles tennis title at the 1934 Wimbledon Championships.

Seeds

  Simonne Mathieu /  Elizabeth Ryan (champions)
  Helen Jacobs /  Sarah Palfrey (quarterfinals)
  Freda James /  Betty Nuthall (third round)
  Evelyn Dearman /  Nancy Lyle (quarterfinals)

Draw

Finals

Top half

Section 1

Section 2

Bottom half

Section 3

Section 4

References

External links

Women's Doubles
Wimbledon Championship by year – Women's doubles
Wimbledon Championships - Doubles
Wimbledon Championships - Doubles